"Shining Star"  is Nami Tamaki's fourth single. It was used as the ending theme for the TV Variety show Matthew's Best Hit TV.  It reached number 9 on the Oricon chart.

Track listing
 Shining Star *Wasurenai Kara*"  Lyrics: Satomi, Shusui, Stefan Aberg   Music: Shusui, Stefan Aberg
 "Kanashimi no Valentine (悲しみのバレンタイン)"   Lyrics: Emi Nishida, Daniel Gibson, Jorgen Ringqvist   Music: Daniel Gibson, Jorgen Ringqvist
 "High School Queen" Lyrics: Emi Nishida, Daniel Gibson, Jorgen Ringqvist   Music: Daniel Gibson, Jorgen Ringqvist
 "Shining Star ☆Wasurenai Kara☆" -Instrumental- (Shining Star☆忘れないから☆)

References

2004 singles
Nami Tamaki songs
2004 songs